Changi Prison Complex, often known simply as Changi Prison, is a prison in Changi in the eastern part of Singapore.

History

First prison

Before  Changi Prison was constructed, the only penal facility in Singapore was at Pearl's Hill, beside the barracks of Sepoy Lines, and was known as the Singapore Prison. By the 1930s, the Singapore Prison was overcrowded and deemed dangerous. The Singapore Prison had a capacity of 1,080. In the early 1920s the average daily number of convicts was 1,043; it reached 1,311 by 1931. Thus the 1931 report presented by the newly appointed Inspector of Prisons for the Straits Settlements, and the Superintendent of Singapore Prisons, Captain Otho Lewis Hancock, recommended providing additional accommodation. This would enable the authorities to segregate long-term prisoners, likely to be of special danger to the community, from short-term prisoners while relieving congestion in the existing facility. Deliberations in the Legislative Council saw opposition to the subsequent plans for constructing a new prison at Changi due to uncertainties in the numbers planned for the accommodation (ranging between 650 and 2,500), costs (moving from 2 million Straits dollars to 10 million Straits dollars and back), the area to be used (250 acres to 1,500 acres), and the possibility of the new prison grounds turning into a white elephant.

Tenders to construct the grounds of the new prison at Changi were put out in 1933. The tender for erection and completion of the quarters was first awarded to Hup Thye and Co for 16,900 Straits dollars on 26 June 1933, and a 2 September 1933 tender for the prison blocks was reportedly awarded to Chop Woh Hup, a local Chinese construction firm, for 1,278,000 Straits dollars on 8 March 1934. Chop Woh Hup had 20 months to complete the construction of the prison blocks. The new prison would be 11.5 miles away from the Singapore settlement along the Changi Road and provided accommodation for 568 prisoners. Completed in 1936, within the 24 feet high, 3,000 feet long prison walls that were made of reinforced concrete, and occupying 13 acres of land, there would be:

 An Administration Block and General Store
 One European Block of Cells and Workshops
 Two Asiatic Blocks of Cells and Workshops
 Kitchen and Laundry Blocks
 Hospital Block
 Recalcitrant and Punishment Blocks

Within the prison walls, there was an inner wall, 14 feet high, exercise yards, and sufficient vacant land to double the accommodation in the future. Outside the wall, 88 acres of land was set aside for gardening activities by the prisoners. Additional quarters were provided for prison staff adjacent to the prison:

 Superintendent's Quarters
 Chief Gaoler's Quarters
 Assistant Medical Officer's Quarters
 Two Deputy Gaolers and 26 European Warders' Quarters
 Asiatic Chief Warder's Quarters
 Nine Blocks of 12 quarters for Asiatic Warders and Attendants
 Ten Quarters for Clerks and Dressers.

Along with additional contracts for water supply and sewage disposal, the total estimated costs of the new establishment came out at 2,050,000 Straits dollars. A subsidiary settlement was developed to support an enterprise of small Chinese traders who would provide necessities to the staff and the prison.

When it was officially operational in June 1937, it was claimed to be one of the best prisons in the British Empire. The design of the prison was based on a "T"-shaped structure, with two cell-block wings stretching out from a central main block (for administration areas and warden-offices), to allow for quick and easy access to either cell-block wing for the wardens whenever necessary (from up above, the prison buildings formed the shape of the top of a telegram/telephone pole). Changi Prison also boasted the use of an advanced and extensive alarm system and had electrical lighting in its cells along with flush-toilets in each. The prison had a holding capacity of 600. Long-term prisoners would be transferred from the existing Singapore Prison.

Conversion into a prisoner of war camp 
During World War II, following the Fall of Singapore in February 1942, the Japanese military detained about 3,000 civilians in Changi Prison, which was built to house only one-fifth of that number. The Japanese used the British Army's Selarang Barracks, near the prison, as a prisoner of war camp, holding some 50,000 Allied soldiers, predominantly British and Australian, and from 1943, Dutch civilians brought over by the Japanese from the islands in the Dutch East Indies (now Indonesia). In the UK, Australia, The Netherlands and elsewhere, the name "Changi" became synonymous with the infamous POW camp nearby, since most of the Japanese prisons were in the Changi area. Around 500 detainees were women who had been separated with their children and marched to the cramped prison camp from their homes. These women and also girls sewed quilts for the prison hospital, daringly embroidering their own secret symbols and stories into the squares, including forget-me-nots, butterflies, angels, scenery of trees and sheep, other symbolic flowers and even a domestic sitting room, ships, birds and a map of Scotland, and one of Australia. They risked severe punishments by sewing depicting their prison environment and adding dozens, or even over 400 names in one case, onto the cloths. One depicted the Changi Stroll, the forced march of the captive women and children over 9 miles to the prison under the occupation by the Japanese on 8 March 1942, coincidentally now International Women's Day commemorating women and the defiance of the suffragettes. Surviving examples of the prison handiwork are in the archives of the British Red Cross, Imperial War Museum, London or held at the Australian War Memorial. About 850 POWs died during their internment in Changi during the Japanese occupation of Singapore, a relatively low rate compared to the overall death rate of 27% for POWs in Japanese camps. However, many more prisoners died after being transferred from Changi to various labour camps outside Singapore, including those on the Burma Railway and at Sandakan airfield.

Allied POWs, mainly Australians, built a chapel at the prison in 1944 using simple tools and found materials. Stanley Warren of the 15th Regiment, Royal Regiment of Artillery painted a series of murals at the chapel. Another British POW, Sgt. Harry Stodgen, built a Christian cross out of a used artillery shell. After the war, the chapel was dismantled and shipped to Australia, while the cross was sent to the UK. The chapel was reconstructed in 1988, and is now located at the Royal Military College, Duntroon, Canberra. The prisoners of war also established an education program nicknamed the Changi University.

After the war, Changi Prison was used by the British to hold Japanese prisoners of war, which included former Imperial Japanese Army, Imperial Japanese Navy and Kenpeitai personnel, police officers and POW camp guards; British troops were used as ad hoc prison officers. Most of the prisoners of war were eventually repatriated to Japan, but eight former Kenpeitai members were found guilty by a military tribunal of torturing 57 internees (which resulted in 15 of them dying) in the "Double tenth" trial on 18 March 1946 at the Supreme Court Building and were sentenced to death. In the inner yard of the prison, three gallows were erected to carry out the sentences, which occurred on April 1946. On 17 October 1945, 260 German prisoners of war (who were former Kriegsmarine personnel and had served on U-boats) were moved from Pasir Panjang to Changi Prison. Almost a year later on 26 June 1946, all German prisoners of war in the prison were notified that they would be repatriated back to Germany via England on a passenger liner, the Empress of Australia.

Kenpeitai

The prison also contained the headquarters of the Kenpeitai, the Japanese military police. The Kenpeitai tortured and executed prisoners there, who they suspected were spies, such as during the Double Tenth incident. Most were civilians, although a small number were Allied POWs.

Changi Chapel and Museum

The original open air chapel, built by the POWs in 1944, was later relocated to Duntroon, Canberra.

In 1988, Singapore built a replica chapel, next to the Changi Prison. The project included a museum. On 1 April 2018, the museum was closed and is scheduled to reopen in 2020.

In 1994, Changi Women's Prison and Drug Rehabilitation Centre was opened.

Demolition and redevelopment
In 2000, a plan was revealed to consolidate the 14 prisons and drug rehabilitation centres (DRCs) that were scattered across the country into one mega complex at Changi Prison location. The complex would sit on a land at the size of 48ha at the cost of S$1.07 billion, however freeing up 61ha of land, which would make way for residential development. The complex would occupy on the lands of existing Changi Prison, Moon Crescent Prison and Jalan Awan Prison.

The plan was carried out in phases, with each phase forming a cluster of prison institutions in the complex. Cluster A was officially launched on 16 August 2004. Cluster A would house the inmates from the existing Changi Prison, Moon Crescent Prison, Jalan Awan Prison and the Changi Reformative Training Centre.

Cluster B was officially launched on 20 January 2010. Cluster B would house 5,600 inmates from standalone prisons: Tanah Merah Prison, Queenstown Remand Prison, Sembawang DRC, Khalsa Crescent Prison, and Selarang Park DRC. The inmates were moved in five separate, single day operations between July and August 2009, making it the largest transfer of prisoners in Singapore history. Cluster B would eventually become the start and the end of most prisoners' journey within the complex, with the admissions and pre-release procedures carried out in the buildings of this cluster.

In 2012, work on building the SPS headquarters on the Complex's grounds began with the $118.5 million contract awarded to Sembawang Engineers and Constructors (SEC). The building would contain a hydrogen integrated proton-exchange membrane fuel cell power plant to generate clean energy to be supplied to the complex. Due by 2014, it was delayed due to financial troubles faced by SEC. On 15 October 2017, Changi Women's Prison was effectively moved into Cluster A. On 4 July 2018, Admiralty West Prison was effectively relocated to TM2, the yet-to-be demolished facilities of Tanah Merah Prison.

Preservation efforts 
Towards the end of 2003, Australian authorities lobbied the Singapore government to preserve the old Changi Prison after knowing that the old Changi Prison would be demolished by April 2004 to redevelop the land for Cluster B, on the basis of its historical significance where 15,000 Australians were imprisoned after Singapore fell to imperial Japan in 1942. On 8 March 2004, a decision was arrived to preserve the old prison's iconic front walls, front gates and two guard-towers at either end of the wall, which was welcomed by Australian's Minister of Foreign Affairs Alexander Downer. In 2016, the historical remnants of the old prison – the entrance gate, wall and turrets – was gazetted as the 72nd National Monument of Singapore. The entrance gate was moved from the adjacent boundary wall and fitted into the retained wall. The remnants are hidden by a tall fence and barely visible from the road. In 2016, SPS would consider redeveloping the area in front of the remnants to make them more visible to the public.

Current prison
Presently, the new Changi Prison Complex houses the most serious criminals in the country, including those serving long sentences (including life imprisonment) and those sentenced to death. It serves as the detention site for death row inmates at Changi before they are executed by hanging, traditionally at dawn on a Friday, except twice, one on 20 May 2016 when the execution of Kho Jabing was carried out at 3:30 pm after his appeal for a stay of execution was dismissed that same morning, as well as on 27 April 2022 when the execution of Nagaenthran K. Dharmalingam was carried out on a Wednesday instead of a Friday.

Changi Prison Complex is also where judicial corporal punishment, in the form of caning, is carried out. Caning sessions at Changi are held twice per week. A former employee of the prison has been quoted in 1995 as saying: "They are flogging more and more these days. Before they were doing maybe 60 on Tuesdays and Fridays, now they're doing a hundred".

Notable detainees

Prisoners of war
 Sir Norman Alexander Professor of Physics, Raffles College, Singapore, Vice-Chancellor, Ahmadu Bello University, Nigeria. Helped build a salt evaporation plant at Changi and a small industrial plant that fermented surgical spirit and other products for prison hospital.
 Sir Harold Atcherley, businessman, public figure and arts administrator.
 Ian Fraser Back (1918-2008) Operations Manager (San Francisco Office) for the Peninsular and Orient Lines (P&O).
 Geoffrey Bingham, AM, MM (1919–2009), who returned to Australia and wrote several books reflecting on his experiences, including his conversion to Christian faith in The Story of the Rice Cakes, Angel Wings, and Tall Grow the Tallow Woods.
 Freddy Bloom (1914–2000), journalist and campaigner for deaf children.
 Russell Braddon  (1921–1995), Australian writer, who wrote "The Naked Island" about his POW experience.
 Sheila Bruhn (née Allan), who wrote about her experiences in Diary of a Girl in Changi.
Sir John Carrick (Australian politician), AC, KCMG (1918–2018). The impact of his experiences on his political thinking is described in his biography, "Carrick: Principles, Politics, and Policy," written by Graeme Starr.
 Anthony Chenevix-Trench (1919–1979), Headmaster of Eton College, 1964–70.
 James Clavell is one of the most famous survivors; he wrote about his experiences in the book King Rat.
 Eugene Ernest Colman, chess master.
 John Coast (1916–1989), British writer and music promoter. He wrote one of the earliest and well-known POW memoirs of Changi The Railroad of Death, (1946). Coast admitted that he and his fellow officers regularly stole coconuts during the night to alleviate their hunger. Other works of Coast include Dancers of Bali (1953), and Dancing Out of Bali (1954).
 Hugh Edward de Wardener, British, CBE, MBE (1915–2013), physician and professor of medicine at Charing Cross Hospital. He was a member of the Royal Army Medical Corps. He operated a Cholera Ward at the prison hospital. He also treated British soldiers who were forced to build the Burma Railway. Although he lived to 98, he suffered from peripheral neuropathy, a legacy of Changi, in his last months.
Noel Duckworth, Chaplain, Churchill College, Cambridge.
 John Cade, Australian psychiatrist who pioneered the use of lithium in bipolar disorder.
 Lieutenant Colonel Sir Ernest Edward "Weary" Dunlop, AC, CMG, OBE (1907–1993), was an Australian surgeon who was renowned for his leadership 
 Carl Alexander Gibson-Hill, medical doctor and Director of the Raffles Museum.
 John Hayter, Anglican priest who later wrote of his experiences in Priest in Prison.
 Percy Herbert (1920–1992) actor. Noted for roles in Bridge on the River Kwai and Mutiny on the Bounty, The Guns of Navarone and Tobruk.
 Graham Hough, Professor of English, University of Cambridge, 1966–75.
 Ezekiel Saleh Manasseh (died 1944), Singaporean rice and opium merchant, died in Changi Prison.
 Sir Percy McElwaine, the Chief Justice of the Straits Settlement.
 Jim Milner AM (1919–2007), Former chairman Washington H. Soul Pattinson and former President NRMA.
 Sir Alexander Oppenheim, mathematician. In 1984, he published "The prisoner's walk: an exercise in number theory", based in part of his experiences at Changi.
 Lieutenant-General Arthur Ernest Percival, commander of Allied forces in Singapore, following his surrender to the Japanese; he was moved to a camp in China in late 1942.
 Sydney Piddington, postwar Australian mentalist entertainer with wife Leslie, "The Piddingtons" ABC and BBC radio and stage mindreading team, who developed his verbal code in Changi.
 Rohan Deakin Rivett (1917–1977), Australian writer, War correspondent and journalist with British Malaya Broadcasting Corporation in Singapore. Formerly a soldier in the Australian Imperial Force. He was captured by the Japanese on 8 March, in Java. His experiences are recorded in his book Behind Bamboo (1946).
 Tjalie Robinson (1911–1974), Dutch Indo-European (Eurasian) author, activist, journalist.
 Ronald Searle, cartoonist.
 Robert Skene, ten goal polo player.
The Reverend James Donald (Donald) Smith, British 18th Division, author of And All The Trumpets, a history of his time as a POW in Changi Prison and building the Burma Road.
 Colonel Julian Taylor FRCS, surgeon.
 Ernest Tipson, linguist.
 Sir Michael Turner (1953–1962), Chief Manager of the Hong Kong and Shanghai Bank
 Arthur Varley, Australian Army officer & diarist 
 Leo Vroman, Dutch poet.
 Stanley Warren, artist and art teacher; murals produced during his incarceration remain at the prison.
 Ian Watt (1917–1999), literary critic, literary historian and professor of English at Stanford University.
 Leonard Wilson, Bishop of Singapore, and later Bishop of Birmingham.
 Sir Michael Woodruff, surgeon and scientist.

Convicted criminals after World War II 
 Hiroshi Abe, Japanese war criminal
 Nick Leeson, former derivatives broker convicted of rogue trading in the collapse of Barings Bank
 Usman Haji Muhammad Ali and Harun Thohir, executed in 1968 for the MacDonald House bombing
 Adrian Lim, Catherine Tan Mui Choo and Hoe Kah Hong, hanged on 25 November 1988 for the 1981 Toa Payoh ritual murders.
 Sek Kim Wah, hanged on 9 December 1988 for killing three people in the 1983 Andrew Road triple murders. He was also involved in an unrelated double murder near Seletar Road.
 Anthony Ler, hanged on 13 December 2002 for soliciting and hiring a 15-year-old youth to murder his wife Annie Leong.
 Mohammed Ali bin Johari, hanged on 19 December 2008 for murdering his stepdaughter Nonoi in March 2006.
 Kho Jabing, a Malaysian who robbed and murdered 40-year-old Chinese construction worker Cao Ruyin in 2008. He was sentenced to death in 2010, and hanged on 20 May 2016, after a 6-year long legal battle against the death penalty.
 Micheal Anak Garing, one of the main perpetrators of the 2010 Kallang Slashings who was convicted of murder and executed in March 2019 for the fatal and grievous assault of 41-year-old Shanmuganathan Dillidurai (who was the final victim of the case).
 Iskandar bin Rahmat, former police officer and convicted murderer of the 2013 Kovan Double Murders case.
 Van Tuong Nguyen, a Vietnamese-Australian executed in 2005 for drug trafficking
 Peter Lloyd, an Australian journalist with the Australian Broadcasting Corporation arrested in July 2008 for drug trafficking and possession
 Mimi Wong and Sim Wor Kum, the first couple to be hanged in Singapore for murder. Wong was additionally the first woman to be executed in Singapore.
 Sunny Ang, the first person to be convicted of murder without a body in Singapore. He was hanged in 1967.
 Z, the minor who was detained indefinitely from 2001 to 2018 for helping Anthony Ler to kill his wife
 Nagaenthran K. Dharmalingam, Malaysian drug trafficker hanged on 27 April 2022 for importing 42.72g of heroin in 2009
 Pannir Selvam Pranthaman, Malaysian drug trafficker on death row since 2017 for importing 51.84g of heroin in 2014
 Abdul Kahar Othman, a Singaporean drug trafficker hanged on 30 March 2022 for importing 66.77g of diamorphine in 2010
 [Pending Trial, Held Pre-Trial after being transferred] The suspect, unnamed due to his age, of the 2021 River Valley Middle School murder attack

In popular culture 
 King Rat (Clavell novel), by James Clavell
 King Rat (film), based on the novel
 Changi: The fortunes of a fictional group of Australian POWs were dramatised in this television miniseries, screened by Australian Broadcasting Corporation in 2001.
 Inside Maximum Security: a 2022 CNA-produced documentary series relating to the lives of five inmates at Changi Prison

See also

Changi Murals
Double Tenth incident
John Mennie – prisoner who drew life in the camps and the Selarang Square Squeeze.
Kempeitai East District Branch
Selarang Barracks Incident

References

External links
 Singapore Prison Service| Changi Prison
 Changi drawings (1942–1945) / John Noel Douglas Harrison (1911–1980)
 Fong, Tanya. "New Changi Prison goes high-tech." The Straits Times: 16 August 2004.
 Choo, Johnson. "New technology at Changi Prison Complex allows focus on rehabilitation." Channel News Asia: 16 August 2004.
 List of U.S. internees at Changi Prison
 Voices of civilian internment: WWII Singapore, a digitised collection in Cambridge Digital Library, contains official administration documents and first hand accounts of life from the civilians interned at Changi/Sime Road

Capital punishment in Singapore
Changi
Japanese prisoner of war and internment camps
Military of Singapore under British rule
Prisons in Singapore
British colonial prisons in Asia
World War II prisoner of war camps
World War II prisoner of war camps in Singapore
British Malaya in World War II
1936 establishments in Singapore
Execution sites